The 1978 NCAA Division III men's basketball tournament was the fourth annual single-elimination tournament to determine the men's collegiate basketball national champion of National Collegiate Athletic Association (NCAA) Division III, held during March 1978.

The tournament field included 30 teams and the national championship rounds were contested in Rock Island, Illinois.

North Park defeated Widener, 69–57, in the championship game to win their first national title.

Regional Rounds

Regional No. 1

Regional No. 2

Regional No. 3

Regional No. 4

Regional No. 5

Regional No. 6

Regional No. 7

Regional No. 8

Championship Rounds
Site: Rock Island, Illinois

See also
1978 NCAA Division I basketball tournament
1978 NCAA Division II basketball tournament
1978 NAIA Basketball Tournament

References

NCAA Division III men's basketball tournament
NCAA Men's Division III Basketball
Ncaa Tournament
NCAA Division III basketball tournament